Hans Harald Hoff, (born April 9, 1963), is a Swedish social democratic politician who has been a member of the Riksdag since 1999. He takes up seat number 17 for Halland County's constituency.

Career 
Hoff joined the Riksdag in 1995 after one of his colleagues left the Riksdag, he served from 1995 to 1998. He was later elected in 1999 as a member of the Social Democratic Party, serving the constituency of Halland County. He has been a member of several Parliamentary committees in the Riksdag notably, the Committee for Finance between 2002 and 2010, the Constitutional Committee (2010-2014), and the Health and Welfare Committee (2014-2018). He is currently a member of the Committee for Culture since assuming office in 2018. He is also a member for the Inter-Parliamentary Union of the Riksdag and serves a board member for the Bank of Sweden Tercentenary Foundation.

Hoff has also been an industry-worker and ombudsman for the Social Democrats in Halland. He is a board member and serves as president for the local faction of the Social Democrats in Halland.

References

Living people
1963 births
Members of the Riksdag from the Social Democrats
Members of the Riksdag 2002–2006
Members of the Riksdag 1998–2002
Members of the Riksdag 2006–2010
Members of the Riksdag 2010–2014
Members of the Riksdag 2014–2018
Members of the Riksdag 2018–2022